Storm Harvest is a BBC Books original novel written by Mike Tucker and Robert Perry and based on the long-running British science fiction television series Doctor Who. It features the Seventh Doctor and Ace.

External links

1999 British novels
1999 science fiction novels
Past Doctor Adventures
Seventh Doctor novels
British science fiction novels
Novels by Mike Tucker
Novels by Robert Perry